This is a list of councillors and aldermen elected to the London County Council from 1937 to 1949.

Elections of all councillors on the London County Council were scheduled to be held every three years. Following the outbreak of the Second World War, the elections due in 1940 were cancelled. Vacant seats were filled by co-option under the terms of the emergency Local Elections and Register of Electors (Temporary Provisions) Act 1939 until the electoral cycle was resumed in 1946.

The size of the council was 124 councillors and 20 aldermen. The councillors were elected for electoral divisions corresponding to the parliamentary constituencies that had been created by the Representation of the People Act 1918, with two councillors for each division. Aldermen were elected by the council itself, and served for a six-year term of office. Half of the aldermen were chosen every three years at the first meeting of the newly elected council. Like the councillors, vacancies on the aldermanic bench thereafter were filled by co-option during the war.

Councillors 1937 - 1949

‡ Previously councillor for a different division.
¶ Previously an alderman.

County aldermen 1937-1949

Aldermen elected for 1934-1940 had their term of office extended until 1946; those elected for 1937-1943 had their term of office extended to 1949.

References

 
London County Council